The 2009 Montana State Bobcats football team represented Montana State University as a member of the Big Sky Conference in the 2009 NCAA Division I FCS football season. The Bobcats were led by third-year head coach Rob Ash and played their home games at Bobcat Stadium. They finished the season 7–4 overall and 5–3 in the Big Sky to place third.

Schedule

References

Montana State
Montana State Bobcats football seasons
Montana State Bobcats football